Radian may refer to:

Radian, a unit of plane angle
Radian (band), a musical group
Radian (EP), an EP by Ana Free
Radian (comics), a number of comics characters
Radian Group, a credit enhancement company
Radian Glacier, Antarctica
Radian Ridge, Antarctica, see Radian Glacier
Yamaha YX600 Radian, a motorbike

See also
 
 
 Steradian
 Gradian